The 2015 South American Aerobic Gymnastics Championships were held in Lima, Peru, August 24–30, 2015. The competition was organized by the Peruvian Gymnastics Federation, and approved by the International Gymnastics Federation.

Participating countries

Medalists

References

2015 in gymnastics
International gymnastics competitions hosted by Peru
2016 in Peruvian sport
South American Gymnastics Championships